Pounding Mill is an unincorporated community in Tazewell County, Virginia, United States.

Maiden Spring was listed on the National Register of Historic Places in 1994.

References

Unincorporated communities in Tazewell County, Virginia
Unincorporated communities in Virginia